Charles Mason was a footballer who played at centre-forward for Port Vale in the mid-1890s.

Career
Mason joined Port Vale in October 1894 and made his debut in a Staffordshire Senior Cup Second Round defeat at Burton Rovers on 25 February 1895. He went on to feature in one Second Division game in the remainder of the 1894–95 season. He played the last five games of the 1895–96 season, and scored his first and only goal in the Football League on 25 March, in a 3–2 defeat at Crewe Alexandra. He left the Athletic Ground in summer 1896.

Career statistics
Source:

References

Year of birth missing
Year of death missing
English footballers
Association football forwards
Port Vale F.C. players
English Football League players